The One is the sixth regular studio album by German pop singer Sasha, released by Columbia Records on 5 December 2014 in German-speaking Europe. It marked his first studio album in five years, following the release of 2009's Good News on a Bad Day.

Track listing

Charts

References

External links 
 Sasha.de — official site

2014 albums
Sasha (German singer) albums